Bob Masters (January 16, 1913 – February 8, 1987) was a professional American football player who played halfback for seven seasons in the National Football League (NFL) with the Philadelphia Eagles, Chicago Bears, and the Steagles, a team that was the result of a temporary merger between the Eagles and Pittsburgh Steelers due to the league-wide manning shortages in 1943 brought on by World War II.

1913 births
1987 deaths
American football halfbacks
Chicago Bears players
Daniel Baker Hillbillies football coaches
Baylor Bears football players
Philadelphia Eagles players
Steagles players and personnel
People from Comanche, Texas
Players of American football from Texas
Wilmington Clippers players